NASA Astronaut Group 4 ("The Scientists") was a group of six astronauts selected by NASA in June 1965. While the astronauts of the first two groups were required to have an undergraduate degree or the professional equivalent in engineering or the sciences (with several holding advanced degrees), they were chosen for their experience as test pilots. Test pilot experience was waived as a requirement for the third group, and military jet fighter aircraft experience could be substituted. Group 4 was the first chosen on the basis of research and academic experience (an M.D. or Ph.D. in the natural sciences or engineering was a prerequisite for selection), with NASA providing pilot training as necessary. Initial screening of applicants was conducted by the National Academy of Sciences.

Of the six ultimately chosen, four had military experience. Schmitt, a geologist, walked on the Moon, while Garriott, Gibson and Kerwin all flew to Skylab. Garriott also flew on the Space Shuttle. Graveline and Michel left NASA without flying in space.

Background 
The launch of the Sputnik 1 satellite by the Soviet Union on October 4, 1957, started a Cold War technological and ideological competition with the United States known as the Space Race. The demonstration of American technological inferiority came as a profound shock to the American public. In response to the Sputnik crisis, although he did not see Sputnik as a grave threat, the President of the United States, Dwight D. Eisenhower, created a new civilian agency, the National Aeronautics and Space Administration (NASA), to oversee an American space program. In doing so, he sought to emphasise the scientific nature of the American space program and downplay its military aspects.

In response to pressure from Congress to match and surpass Soviet achievements in space, NASA created an American crewed spaceflight project called Project Mercury. Project Mercury attracted criticism from the scientific community, who preferred a more methodical approach to space science. With the replacement of Eisenhower by  John F. Kennedy in 1961, a President's Science Advisory Committee panel headed by Donald Hornig was charged with reporting on Project Mercury. NASA feared that space exploration would be turned over to the Department of Defense, but found support for an expanded scientific space program from the Space Science Board of the National Academy of Sciences (NAS). At its meeting on February 10–11, 1961, the Space Science Board adopted a formal resolution to support crewed space exploration.

Confidence that the United States was catching up with the Soviet Union was shattered on April 12, 1961, when the Soviet Union launched Vostok 1, and cosmonaut Yuri Gagarin became the first man to orbit the Earth. In response, Kennedy announced a far more ambitious goal on May 25, 1961: to put a man on the Moon by the end of the decade. This already had a name: Project Apollo. Over the next few years, space science would constitute up to 20 percent of NASA's budget, but it would be dwarfed by spending on Project Apollo. NASA asked the Space Board to conduct a review of the space program, and this was done at the State University of Iowa between June 17 and July 31, 1962. The study recommended that scientists be included in the astronaut program, and that a scientist be included in the first mission to the Moon.

Robert B. Voas, NASA's Assistant Director for Human Factors, drew up a proposal for the selection and training of scientists as astronauts, which he submitted in draft form on May 6, 1963. He pointed out the value in getting the support of the scientific community at a time when NASA's budget faced opposition in Congress. NASA officially announced an intention to recruit scientists as astronauts on June 5, 1963. On October 1, 1964, NASA announced that it was recruiting scientist astronauts as well as another intake of pilot astronauts.

Selection 
Key selection criteria were that candidates:
 Be a United States citizen;
 Born on or after August 1, 1930;
  or less in height;
 With a doctorate in the natural sciences, medicine or engineering, or the equivalent.
The height requirement was firm, an artifact of the size of the Apollo spacecraft. Candidates had to have copies of their academic transcripts from each university they had attended, along with Educational Testing Service scores and medical history were sent directly to the Astronaut Selection Board of the NAS by December 31, 1964, along with medical examination results. In addition, they could send supporting materials, which might include papers they had written, research they had conducted, or simply their thoughts about space science. They also had to be able to pass a Class I Military Flight Status Physical. This required 20/20 uncorrected vision. The helmets astronauts wore could not accommodate glasses, and contact lenses were considered to be unsuitable in space. 

A total of 1,351 applications were received by the deadline. About 200 of these were rejected for failing to meet the basic age, citizenship, height or vision criteria. The names of 400 applicants (four of whom were women) were forwarded to NAS to review their academic qualifications. The NAS selection board consisted of Allan H. Brown, Loren D. Carlson, Frederick L. Ferris, Thomas Gold, H. Keffer, Clifford Morgan, Eugene Shoemaker, Robert Speed and Aaron Waters. The NAS boards reduced the number of candidates to just fifteen. On May 2, 1965, they were sent to the United States Air Force School of Aerospace Medicine at Brooks Air Force Base, near San Antonio, Texas, for medical examinations. The final step, on May 12, 1965, was an interview by the NASA selection panel, which consisted of Charles A. Berry, John F. Clark, Maxime Faget, Warren J. North and Mercury Seven astronauts Alan B. Shepard and Donald K. Slayton. The names of the six successful candidates were publicly announced at a press conference on June 29, 1965. They were the first astronauts chosen on the basis of research and academic experience.

Group members

Training 
Two of the six were qualified pilots: Michel with the Air Force, and Kerwin with the Navy. They were given jobs related to space suits and Apollo experiments, respectively, while the rest were sent to Williams Air Force Base in Arizona for 55 weeks of pilot training. Graveline resigned on August 18, 1965, after his first wife, Carole Jane  Tollerton, filed for divorce, in which she accused him of "violent and ungovernable outbursts of temper." To avoid a scandal, and to send a message to other astronauts, NASA demanded his resignation. Apart from Michel, who worked at nearby Rice University, they found that they were unable to continue their previous research. When the pilot training was complete, all joined Alan Bean's Apollo Applications Branch.

Along with the nineteen pilot astronauts of NASA Astronaut Group 5, the group commenced astronaut training. Training was conducted on Monday to Wednesday, with Thursday and Friday for field trips. They were given classroom instruction in astronomy (154 hours), aerodynamics (8 hours), rocket propulsion (8 hours), communications (10 hours), space medicine (17 hours), meteorology (4 hours), upper atmospheric physics (12 hours), navigation (34 hours), orbital mechanics (23 hours), computers (8 hours) and geology (112 hours).  The training in geology included field trips to the Grand Canyon and the Meteor Crater in Arizona, Philmont Scout Ranch in New Mexico, Horse Lava Tube System in Bend, Oregon, and the ash flow in the Marathon Uplift in Texas, and other locations, including Alaska and Hawaii. There was also jungle survival training for the scientists in Panama, and desert survival training around Reno, Nevada. Water survival training was conducted at Naval Air Station Pensacola using the Dilbert Dunker. Some 30 hours of briefings were conducted on the Apollo spacecraft, and twelve on the lunar module.

Operations 
The scientists had various assignments. Schmitt, the only geologist in the group, spent most of his time on lunar landing site selection. By 1967, it looked as if many fewer missions would be flown than originally planned, and the astronauts were risking their careers. Provision was made to allow the pilot astronauts to keep their pilot skills honed, but there was no such concession for the scientists. Gibson became the first of the six scientists to be named to a crew when he was selected as a member of the support crew for Apollo 12 in April 1969, but the announcement of prime and backups crews for Apollo 13 and Apollo 14 in August 1969 was the last straw for many. The prime and backup crews included eight members of the 1966 group of pilots, and Apollo 14 would be commanded by Mercury Seven astronaut Alan Shepard. Michel resigned to return to teaching at Rice in September, and there were resignations by NASA scientists Donald U. Wise, Elbert A. King Jr, Wilmot N. Hess and Eugene Shoemaker. All had their reasons for leaving, but all were highly critical of NASA. The calls for more participation by scientists did not go unheeded, and NASA Deputy Administrator George Mueller wrote to the director of the Manned Spacecraft Center (MSC), Robert R. Gilruth, in September 1969, and asked him to give the matter his personal attention.

The MSC took steps to improve relations with the scientific community. On March 26, 1970, Slayton announced that Schmitt would be backup lunar module pilot of Apollo 15; Richard F. Gordon, the command module pilot of Apollo 12, was named as backup commander, and Vance Brand as command module pilot. Under the prevailing rotation system, this set Schmitt up to walk on the Moon on Apollo 18. However, in September 1970, two more Apollo missions were cancelled; Apollo 17 would be the last Apollo mission to the Moon. Once again, frustration boiled over. Associate Administrator Homer E. Newell Jr. spoke with the scientist astronauts, and took their case to NASA Administrator James C. Fletcher. Newell recommended that a scientist astronaut be assigned to the next Moon mission, and that two be assigned to each Skylab mission. Although Slayton insisted on two trained pilot astronauts for each Skylab mission, on August 13, 1971, Schmitt was named as part of the prime crew of Apollo 17. He would become the last man to step onto the lunar surface. The remaining three flew on Skylab missions, but only one per mission, as the "science pilot".

Notes

References 

 
 
 
 
 
 
 
 

NASA Astronaut Corps
Lists of astronauts
Harrison Schmitt